Pet Corner, originally Pet Shop, was a Canadian children's informational television series which aired on CBC Television from 1953 to 1954.

Premise
This children's series was hosted by Rick Campbell. Campbell interviewed guests about their pets. The original program title was Pet Shop, but was changed to Pet Corner by 3 December 1953. The production involved the Toronto Humane Society.

Scheduling
15-minute episodes were broadcast from 22 October 1953 to 1 July 1954 at 5:15 p.m. each Thursday.

References

External links
 

CBC Television original programming
1950s Canadian children's television series
1953 Canadian television series debuts
1954 Canadian television series endings
Black-and-white Canadian television shows